Daxin Subdistrict  is a township-level division situated in Jimo District of Qingdao, Shandong, China. , it administers Qingdao Iron & Steel Group Farm Residential Quarter and the following 78 villages:
Daxin Village
Qiaojia Village
Guanlu Village
Gongjia Village
Xinsheng Village
Lijiahanwa Village
Hanjiahanwa Village
Chenjia Village
Zhonggezhuang Village
Xiaodingjia Village
Xiaojinjia Village
Dajinjia Village
Haojiazhuang Village
Nianzitou Village
Xiaoxin Village
Xinfuzhuang Village
Duijiubo Village
Shigubu Village
Gaojiawa Village
Dafanjia Village
Xiaofanjia Village
Nanwangjiazhuang Village
Sijiatuan First Village
Sijiatuan Second Village
Sijiatuan Third Village
Xinhuayuan Village
Zhaojiatuan Village
Lijiatuan Village
Nanzhaijiatuan Village
Beizhaijiatuan Village
Beiwangjiazhuang Village
Changjiajie Village
Puxi Village
Pudong Village
Wangjiajie Village
Zhaojiajie Village
Zhongjiajie Village
Renjiatun Village
Taohang Village
Fujiatun Village
Liangjiahuang Village
Houjiatun Village
Honggou Village
Dongsuntangzhuang Village
Nansuntangzhuang Village
Xisuntangzhuang Village
Gebu Village
Tanglitun Village
Qujiatun Village
Wangjiatuan Village
Faxuanqiao Village
Zhanjiatun Village
Panjiatun Village
Caochang Village
Babaozhuang Village
Yangjiazhuang Village
Yuanjiatun Village
Taitou First Village
Taitou Second Village
Taitou Third Village
Taitou Fourth Village
Wangjia Village
Changzhi Village
Yinjia Village
Zhaojia Village
Songjiazhuang Village
Jiangjia Village
Yangjia Village
Xiaodian Village
Zhanggezhuangyili Village
Zhanggezhuangsanli Village
Zhanggezhuangsili Village
Zhanggezhuangliuli Village
Xiaofangezhuang Village
Daokoudong Village
Fandong Village
Fanxi Village
Qianjin Village

See also 
 List of township-level divisions of Shandong

References 

Township-level divisions of Shandong
Geography of Qingdao
Subdistricts of the People's Republic of China